Kieran John Ault-Connell, OAM (born 30 July 1981) is an Australian Paralympic athlete.  He was born in Melbourne, and has cerebral palsy. He took up athletics after watching the 1996 Atlanta Paralympics. At the 1998 IPC Athletics World Championships, he won two bronze medals in javelin and long jump. He won two gold medals at the 2000 Sydney Games in the men's 4x100 m relay T38 and the 4x400 m relay T38 events, for which he received a Medal of the Order of Australia.  In the process, he set two world records. At the 2004 Athens Games, he won a silver medal in the Men's Javelin F37 event.

He was previously married to Australian Paralympic athlete Eliza Ault-Connell and they have two daughters and a son.

References

External links

 Kieran Ault-Connell at Australian Athletics Historical Results
 

1981 births
Living people
Paralympic athletes of Australia
Athletes (track and field) at the 2000 Summer Paralympics
Athletes (track and field) at the 2004 Summer Paralympics
Medalists at the 2000 Summer Paralympics
Medalists at the 2004 Summer Paralympics
Paralympic gold medalists for Australia
Paralympic silver medalists for Australia
Paralympic medalists in athletics (track and field)
Recipients of the Medal of the Order of Australia
Cerebral Palsy category Paralympic competitors
Track and field athletes with cerebral palsy
Athletes from Melbourne
Australian male sprinters
Australian male long jumpers
Australian male javelin throwers